San Teodoro or Saint Theodore of Pavia (died c. 778 ) was bishop of Pavia from 743 until his death.  He was repeatedly exiled by the Lombard kings.  His feast day is May 20.  Along with Syrus (Siro), he is a patron saint of Pavia, and his body is housed in the church with his name.

See also
 Diocese of Pavia

Notes

References

.

778 deaths
8th-century Italian bishops
8th-century Christian saints
Bishops of Pavia
Italian saints
Year of birth unknown